Lymbyc Systym is an American instrumental band from Tempe, Arizona, United States, which formed in 2001, consisting of brothers Jared and Michael Bell. Their sound combines elements of instrumental rock and electronic music.  Lymbyc Systym have toured with Broken Social Scene, The Books, Crystal Castles, The Album Leaf,  Her Space Holiday, Buckethead, This Will Destroy You, Foxing and The One AM Radio.  The duo have released records with Mush Records, Magic Bullet Records, Hobbledehoy Record Co, Western Vinyl and & Records (Japan). Michael Bell died on November 10, 2016, under undisclosed circumstances, leaving the future of Lymbyc Systym uncertain.

Background
Jared Bell says the intentional misspelling of the Limbic System was to own it, lamenting comparisons to Lynyrd Skynyrd. For much of the recording of their 2012 album, Symbolyst the brothers were not in the same state. "Our first full length when we lived in the same house in south Scottsdale, we were treating it like a job and we literally worked on it every day until it was done," Michael Bell has explained. "After that, it morphed into a process of exchanging ideas online ... Even when we lived in New York, we never met up until the end. We worked on stuff separately and exchanged ideas [online.]"

Discography
Albums
Love Your Abuser (2007)
Shutter Release (2009)
Symbolyst (2012)
Split Stones (2015)

EPs
Live Kin (2003)
Carved by Glaciers (2005)
Field Studies (2009) - Split EP with This Will Destroy You
New Varieties (2016)

Compilations and remixes
Bubonic Tonic (Lotus Remix) on Copy/Paste/Repeat (2007)
Truth Skull (Live radio performance) on WUAG Presents: Wooden Anniversary (2008)
Love Your Abuser Remixed (2008)
What Time Is It Now (The Consulate General Remix) on What Time Is It Now EP (2010)
The Architekt (Arms and Sleepers Remix) on Matador Remixed (2010)
Remixes & Miscellaneous (2013)
XPLAYMIX 21 | 2015 (2015)
Paraboloid (Evenings Remix) (2016)

References

External links
 Western Vinyl Artist Page
 Mush Records Artist Page
 Touring History - Pitchfork, Pitchfork, CMJ, Spin.com
 SEEN: Download Lymbyc Systym
 Interview with Lymbyc Systym

American post-rock groups
Electronic music duos
Musical groups from Tempe, Arizona
Musical groups established in 2001
Sibling musical duos
Western Vinyl artists
American musical duos
American electronic music groups